The Habsiguda Metro Station is located on the Blue Line of the Hyderabad Metro. It is part of Corridor III of the Hyderabad Metro starting from Nagole and towards HITECh city and was opened to the public on 28 November 2017.

References

Hyderabad Metro stations